Michael Mintenko (born November 7, 1975) is a former competition swimmer who represented Canada in butterfly and freestyle events in various international championships, including the 2000 and 2004 Summer Olympics.  He is a ten-time medallist, spanning the FINA world championships, Pan Pacific Championships, and Commonwealth Games.

Mintenko is married to Olympic gold medallist Lindsay Benko.

See also
 List of Commonwealth Games medallists in swimming (men)

References

External links
 Team Canada Profile
 Profile in FINA-site

1975 births
Living people
Canadian male butterfly swimmers
Canadian male freestyle swimmers
Medalists at the FINA World Swimming Championships (25 m)
Olympic swimmers of Canada
Sportspeople from Moose Jaw
Swimmers at the 2000 Summer Olympics
Swimmers at the 2004 Summer Olympics
UNLV Rebels men's swimmers
World Aquatics Championships medalists in swimming
Commonwealth Games silver medallists for Canada
Swimmers at the 2002 Commonwealth Games
Commonwealth Games medallists in swimming
Goodwill Games medalists in swimming
Competitors at the 2001 Goodwill Games
Medallists at the 2002 Commonwealth Games